Baird's junco (Junco bairdi) is a species of junco, a group of small, grayish New World sparrows. It is endemic to the forests in the higher elevations of the Sierra de la Laguna mountain range of the southern Baja California Peninsula in Baja California Sur, Mexico.

Taxonomy

Systematics

While originally described as a distinct species, it was once considered a subspecies of the yellow-eyed junco (Junco phaeonotus) before being recognized as a distinct species again after further research.

Etymology

The type specimens of Baird's junco were collected on 2 February 1883 by Lyman Belding at "Laguna, Lower California" [=Baja California], and it was named for Spencer Fullerton Baird, an American ornithologist and naturalist, by Robert Ridgway, the curator of birds at the United States National Museum at that time.

Range and Habitat

Baird's junco is restricted to the higher elevations of the Sierra de la Laguna, Baja California Sur, Mexico, where it nests in pine-oak forests. These low elevational records have been attributed to non-breeding individuals, and no significant pattern of elevational migration has been noted.

References

Friis, G., P. Aleixandre, R. Rodriguez-Estrella, A.G. Navarro-Sigüenza, and B. Milá. 2016. Rapid postglacial diversification and long-term stasis within the songbird genus Junco: phylogeographic and phylogenomic evidence. Molecular Ecology 25: 6175–6195.
Milá, B., P. Aleixandre, S. Alvarez-Nordström, and J. McCormack. 2016. More than meets the eye: lineage diversity and evolutionary history of dark-eyed and yellow-eyed juncos. Pages 179–198 in E.D. Ketterson and J.W. Atwell (editors), Snowbird. University of Chicago Press, Chicago.
Pieplow, N.D., and C.D. Francis. 2011. Song differences among subspecies of Yellow-eyed Juncos (Junco phaeonotus). Wilson Journal of Ornithology 123: 464–471.

Baird's junco
Birds of Mexico
Baird's junco
Endemic birds of Mexico
Taxa named by Robert Ridgway